Muine Bheag halt serves the town of Bagenalstown, in County Carlow, Ireland.  Nearby is Leighlinbridge in the same county.

It is a station on the Dublin to Waterford intercity route.

The station is staffed; the main platform is fully accessible but the far-side platform (used only when two trains pass in the station) is accessible only by stairs and a footbridge.

History 

The station opened on 24 July 1848 as Bagnalstown (renamed Bagenalstown by April 1910). The station was designed by Sancton Wood.

Opened by the Great Southern and Western Railway, the station was amalgamated into the Great Southern Railways.
The line was then nationalised, passing to the Córas Iompair Éireann with the Transport Act 1944 which took effect from 1 January 1945.

The station was closed to passengers on 30 March 1963 and for goods traffic on 6 September 1976. Although the station closed the line remained open.

Station passed on to the Iarnród Éireann in 1986 and was re-opened, renamed Muine Bheag, in 1988. The station nameboards bore solely the Irish language name until c.2015 when they were replaced with the bilingual Muine Bheag/Bagenalstown.

See also 
 List of railway stations in Ireland

References

External links
Iarnród Éireann Muine Bheag (Bagenalstown) Station Website

Iarnród Éireann stations in County Carlow
Railway stations in County Carlow
Railway stations opened in 1848
Railway stations in the Republic of Ireland opened in 1848